Le Ritord is a mountain of the Pennine Alps, situated near Bourg Saint Pierre in the canton of Valais. It is part of the Grand Combin massif.

The mountains overlooks the Boveire Glacier on its north side.

References

External links
 Le Ritord on Hikr

Mountains of the Alps
Alpine three-thousanders
Mountains of Valais
Mountains of Switzerland